Happy Ghost IV (released in the Philippines as Magic to Win 4) (Chinese: 開心鬼救開心鬼) is a 1990 Hong Kong comedy film directed by Clifton Ko. The film stars Raymond Wong and Pauline Yeung.

Cast
Raymond Wong as Hong Sum-kwai
Pauline Yeung as Annie
Beyond as Man, Mo, Ying, and Kit
Woo Fung as Annie's father
Charlie Cho as Chiu
Tommy Wong as Crazy Bill
Lau Shun as Crazy Kwan Yeung
James Wong as judge
Clifton Ko as man in washroom

Release
Happy Ghost IV grossed a total of HK$11,780,725. The film ran in Hong Kong theatres from 30 June 1990 to 2 August 1990. In the Malaysia, the film was launched on TV3 called as Cinema programme slot aired on Friday, 9 December 2022 at 10pm until 11:59pm MST in Cantonese dubbed and Malay subtitle.

Reception
In his book Horror and Science Fiction Film IV, Donald C Willis described Happy Ghost IV as an "occasionally funny low comedy" with "some okay "invisible ghost" effects".

See also
Clifton Ko filmography
List of Hong Kong films of 1990

Notes

References

External links

1990s Cantonese-language films
1990 comedy films
1990 films
Hong Kong comedy films
1990s ghost films
Hong Kong ghost films
Films directed by Clifton Ko
1980s Hong Kong films
1990s Hong Kong films